Sir Thomas Willans Nussey, 1st Baronet  (12 October 1868 – 12 October 1947) was an English barrister and Liberal Party politician. He was the Member of Parliament (MP) for Pontefract from 1893 to 1910.

Family and education
Willans Nussey was the son of Thomas Nussey, a woollen manufacturer of Bramley Grange, Thorner near Leeds in the West Riding of Yorkshire. His  sister Hilda (1875-1962) was  a VAD  nurse  during  the Great War  at  Gledhow Hall. The Nussey siblings' relative was  "Mrs Agnes  Nussey  of  Potternewton Hall" who corresponded  with  their  cousin Ellen Nussey.

Thomas was educated at Malvern College until Christmas 1882, then attended Leamington College for Boys and Trinity Hall, Cambridge. In 1897 he married Edith Daniel the daughter of a medical doctor from Fleetwood in Lancashire. At the time of the marriage the Daniels were living in Scarborough and the wedding took place there. They had one son.  Edith Nussey died in 1934 and Sir Willans married again in 1935. His second wife was Edith Maud Cliff OBE from  Leeds who  was  the  Commandant of  Gledhow Hall  Military  Hospital during the Great War.

Career
Nussey went in for the law and in 1893 he was called to the bar at the Inner Temple. However he does not seem to have required an occupation to provide an income.  He started to engage in political activity as soon as he came down from university and MPs did not receive salaries until 1911. In the 1830s, Nussey's father had  started a woollen manufacturing business with his two brothers, Obadiah – Mayor of  Leeds in 1864 –  and Joseph, and this grew into a large and successful  enterprise. It seems likely that Nussey had access to family money to allow him to seek a career in politics.

Politics
Nussey held Liberal political views and was said to have remained faithful to the ideas and policies of William Ewart Gladstone all his life. He first stood for Parliament at the 1892 general election in the Maidstone division of Kent but in June 1893 there was a by-election in the Pontefract constituency in the West Riding of Yorkshire. The election of the sitting Liberal MP for Pontefract, Harold Reckitt at a by-election in February 1893, was declared void following an election petition and Nussey was selected to contest the seat. He won the by-election narrowly  but held his seat until the December 1910 general election when he retired from the House of Commons.

Honours and appointments
In 1909, Nussey was created a baronet in the Birthday Honours list. After stepping down from Parliament he in continued public life. He was a justice of the peace for the North Riding, chairman of the local bench, chairman of the North Yorkshire Quarter Sessions, chairman of the Appeals Committee and a deputy lieutenant of the North Riding.

Death
Nussey died at his home, Sutton Howgrave, Bedale  in the North Riding of Yorkshire on 12 October 1947 aged exactly 79 years.  Edith, Lady  Nussey  died in 1962. The heir to the Nussey baronetcy was his son from his first marriage, Thomas Moore Nussey (19 July 1898 – 25 October 1971).

Papers
A collection of letters sent by Nussey's to the Liberal prime minister, Sir Henry Campbell-Bannerman, has been deposited in the British Library manuscript collection.

References

1868 births
1947 deaths
People educated at Malvern College
Alumni of Trinity Hall, Cambridge
Members of the Inner Temple
English barristers
Liberal Party (UK) MPs for English constituencies
UK MPs 1892–1895
UK MPs 1895–1900
UK MPs 1900–1906
UK MPs 1906–1910
Politics of West Yorkshire
Baronets in the Baronetage of the United Kingdom
Deputy Lieutenants of the North Riding of Yorkshire
English justices of the peace